Emperor Min (愍帝, 閔帝) may refer to:

King Min of Qi (reigned 324 or 300–284 BC), briefly proclaiming as Di (帝, emperor) until 288 BC
Emperor Xian of Han (181–234, reigned 189–220), also known as Emperor Min of Han
Emperor Min of Jin (300–318, reigned 313–316), emperor of the Western Jin Dynasty
Xiao Yuanming (died 556, reigned in 555), Emperor Min of Liang
Emperor Jiemin of Northern Wei (498–532, reigned 531–532)
Emperor Xiaomin of Northern Zhou (542–557, reigned 557)
Emperor Yang of Sui (569–618, reigned 604–618), also known as Emperor Min of Sui
Li Conghou (914–934, reigned 933–934), also known as Emperor Min of Later Tang
Emperor Aizong of Jin (1198–1234, reigned 1224–1234), also known as Emperor Min of Jin
Chongzhen Emperor (1611–1644, reigned 1627–1644), also known as Emperor Min of Ming

See also
 Emperor Mẫn (愍帝)